The 1948 Titleholders Championship was contested from March 18–21 at Augusta Country Club. It was the 9th edition of the Titleholders Championship.

This event was won by Patty Berg.

Final leaderboard

External links
St. Petersburg Times source
The News and Courier source

Titleholders Championship
Golf in Georgia (U.S. state)
Titleholders Championship
Titleholders Championship
Titleholders
Titleholders Championship
Women's sports in Georgia (U.S. state)